South Carolina Highway 51 (SC 51) is a primary state highway in the U.S. state of South Carolina. The first segment, traveling north–south, connects the cities of Georgetown and Florence, via the towns of Hemingway, Johnsonville, and Pamplico. The second segment, near Fort Mill, is a reciprocated continuation of North Carolina Highway 51 (NC 51) from the North Carolina state line to U.S. Route 21 (US 21).

Route description

The main segment of SC 51 begins at US 701, just north of Georgetown.  Traveling in a northwesterly direction, along Browns Ferry Road, it merges onto SC 41 in Rhems. For the next , SC 41/SC 51 straddle the county line between Georgetown and Williamsburg counties, before breaking off towards Hemingway, near Rome Crossroads.  Connecting with SC 261 in Hemingway, it soon enters Florence County and Johnsonville. Continuing north, it changes from traveling along SC 41 to US 378 in Kingsburg and continues west. After , it splits from US 378 in Salem, traveling northwest along Pamplico Highway towards Pamplico and finally Florence.  In Florence, SC 51 connects with US 301 (Freedom Boulevard) and US 52 (Irby Street); it then travels west along Second Loop Road to US 76 where it ends. The majority of the route is a two-lane rural road through mostly swamp and farmland. Around Hemingway and Florence, the route expands to four lanes and has a median.

The York County segment of SC 51 is a short  road that starts at US 21 near Fort Mill and ends at the North Carolina state line, where it continues on as NC 51 through Pineville.  The route is entirely two-lane, expanding to four lanes at the state line.

History
Established as a new primary routing in 1926; the original routing ran from SC 40 (today as US 701) along Choppee Road (today as S-22-4) and Hemingway Highway (today as SC 261) to Hemingway then onto Florence, ending at SC 41 (today as US 52).  The route was fully paved by 1939.  In the early 1960s, the SC 51 was rerouted as a concurrency with SC 41 from Hemingway to Rhems, then to US 701 near Georgetown.  In 1978, SC 51 was extended along Second Loop Road, in Florence, to US 76.

The York County segment of SC 51 was established in 1969.  In the prior year, US 21 was rerouted northwest onto a new freeway route into North Carolina and its old alignment through Pineville was replaced by an extension of NC 51 to the state line.  South Carolina reciprocated with SC 51, keeping the route number consistent across the border.

Junction list

Special routes

Pamplico alternate route

South Carolina Highway 51 Alternate (SC 51 Alt.) was an alternate route that existed entirely within the southern part of Pamplico. It was established in November 1936 as a short loop off of the mainline, using Main Street, Trade Street, and 3rd Avenue. In 1947, it was decommissioned.

Florence connector route

South Carolina Highway 51 Connector (SC 51 Conn.) is a  connector route that serves to connect SC 51 and US 52. Its entire length is known as Pamplico Highway and is unsigned.

It begins at an intersection with the SC 51 mainline (known as West 2nd Loop Road west of here and also known as Pamplico Highway east of here). It travels to the northwest and immediately curves slightly more to the north-northwest. It then reaches its northern terminus, an intersection with US 52 (South Irby Street) and the southern terminus of James Jones Avenue.

See also

References

External links

 
 Mapmikey's South Carolina Highways Page: SC 51

051
Transportation in Georgetown County, South Carolina
Transportation in Williamsburg County, South Carolina
Transportation in Florence County, South Carolina
Transportation in York County, South Carolina